Lev Kuznetsov (1 June 1930 – 16 March 2015) was a Soviet fencer. He won two bronze medals at the 1956 Summer Olympics.

References

1930 births
2015 deaths
Russian male fencers
Soviet male fencers
Fencers at the 1952 Summer Olympics
Fencers at the 1956 Summer Olympics
Olympic fencers of the Soviet Union
Medalists at the 1956 Summer Olympics
Olympic medalists in fencing
Olympic bronze medalists for the Soviet Union
Martial artists from Moscow